The Trixy Princess is an Austrian autogyro designed and produced by Trixy Aviation Products of Dornbirn. The aircraft is supplied complete and ready-to-fly.

Design and development
The Princess was derived from the Trixy G 4-2 R. It features a single main rotor, a two-seats-in tandem enclosed cockpit, tricycle landing gear with wheel pants, plus a tail caster and a four-cylinder, liquid and air-cooled, four stroke  Rotax 912 twin-cylinder or  Trixy 912 Ti engine in pusher configuration. The Mitsubishi powerplant includes a main rotor prerotator capable of producing 280 rpm for takeoff, reducing the takeoff roll.

The aircraft fuselage is made from composites.

Unlike many other autogyro builders Trixy Aviation uses a swash plate in its rotor head designs, rather than a tilt head. This makes the design more sensitive to fly and requires special type training.

Specifications (Princess)

See also
List of rotorcraft

References

External links

Princess
2010s Austrian sport aircraft
Single-engined pusher autogyros